Abromeit is a patronymic surname. It means "son of Abrom", "" (Lithuanian article), or "Abraham" in Baltic language. People with this surname include:

 Franz Abromeit (1907–1964), Nazi SS officer 
 Fritz Abromeit (1923–2004), German footballer
 Johannes Abromeit (1857–1946), German botanist
 Jutta Abromeit (born 1959), German rower

See also 
 Abromaitis (e.g. Algirdas Abromaitis, Lithuanian form)